Bogë is a small mountainous village and also a holiday resort village in western Kosovo. Bogë is located in the Bjeshket e Nemuna (cursed mountains on Albanian Alps) mountain range on an altitude of about 1,300m - 1,400m. Nearby the village is located the peak of Hajla at 2,403m and the Bistrica e Pejës which has its source not far from the village. The village is nestled in by surrounding mountains many of which are picturesque.

The name Bogë may have its origin from the Proto-Indo-European root *bhoĝ-, meaning "the running water".

Bogë is rapidly becoming a popular holiday resort in Kosovo; many holiday chalets have been built, and the presence of the ski resort attracts many visitors.

Gallery

Notes

References 

Villages in Peja
Accursed Mountains
Ski areas and resorts in Kosovo